Irakly Mikhaylovich Manelov (born 19 September 2002) is a Russian football player who plays for Arsenal Tula on loan from FC Krasnodar.

Club career
He made his debut in the Russian Football National League for FC Krasnodar-2 on 10 July 2021 in a game against FC Spartak-2 Moscow.

He made his Russian Premier League debut for FC Krasnodar on 18 September 2021 in a game against FC Akhmat Grozny.

In January 2023, Manelov signed for Arsenal Tula on loan until the end of the season.

Career statistics

References

External links
 
 Profile by Russian Football National League

2002 births
People from Vyselkovsky District
Sportspeople from Krasnodar Krai
Living people
Russian footballers
Association football forwards
FC Krasnodar-2 players
FC Krasnodar players
FC Arsenal Tula players
Russian Second League players
Russian First League players
Russian Premier League players